Brodie  can be a given name or a surname of Scottish origin, and a location in Moray, Scotland, its meaning is uncertain; it is not clear if Brodie, as a word, has its origins in the Gaelic or Pictish languages. In 2012 this name was the 53rd most popular boys' name in Scotland. The given name originates from the surname.

Origin

The lands of Brodie are in Scotland, between Morayshire and Nairnshire, on the modern border that separates the Scottish Highlands and Moray. In the time of the Picts (pre 10th century), this location was at the heart of the Kingdom of Moravia. Early references show that the Brodie lands to be governed by a Tòiseach; in Scottish Gaelic, Tòiseach translates as "chieftain" or "clan chief", later to become Thane. Part of the Brodie lands were originally Temple Lands, owned by the order of the Knights Templar. It is uncertain if the Brodies took their name from the lands of Brodie, or that the lands were named after the clan.

Meaning
Early references to Brodie were written as Brochy, Brothy, Brothie, Brothu, Brode.
Various meanings to the name Brodie have been advanced, but given the Brodies uncertain origin, and the varying ways Brodie has been pronounced/written, these remain but suppositions. Some of the suggestions that have been advanced as to the meaning of the name Brodie are:
Gaelic for "a little ridge"; "a brow", or "a precipice";
"ditch" or "mire", from the old Irish word broth;
 Second son.
"muddy place", from the Gaelic word brothach;
"a point", "a spot", or "level piece of land", from the Gaelic word Brodha;
or originated from the Pict name Brude, Bruide or Bridei from the Pictish King name Bridei.

Surname

 Alexander Oswald Brodie (1849–1918), Governor of Arizona Territory
 Allan G. Brodie (1897–1976), American orthodontics educator
 Angela Hartley Brodie (1934–2017), British pharmacologist and cancer researcher
 Sir Benjamin Collins Brodie, 1st Baronet (1783–1862), English physiologist and surgeon
 Sir Benjamin Collins Brodie, 2nd Baronet (1817–1880), English chemist
 Bernard Beryl Brodie (1907–1989), American biochemist
 Bernard Brodie (military strategist) (1910–1978), American military strategist
 Chic Brodie (footballer), Scottish footballer
 Dan Brodie, singer/songwriter from Melbourne, Australia
 David Brodie (disambiguation), several people
 Don Brodie, American actor and director
 Douglas Neil Brodie, businessman and political figure in Nova Scotia
 Elizabeth Brodie (1794–1864), birth name of the Duchess of Gordon
 Eric Brodie, Scottish footballer
 Fawn M. Brodie (1915–1981), American biographer and professor of history at UCLA
 H. Keith H. Brodie, American psychiatrist, president emeritus of Duke University
 Harold J Brodie, Canadian mycologist
 Howard Brodie, American sketch artist known for his World War II combat sketches
 Ian Brodie, Canadian political scientist
 Ian Brodie (journalist) (1936–2008), British journalist
 Imogen Harding Brodie (1878–1956), American vocal teacher and contralto soloist
 Sir Israel Brodie (1895–1979),  Chief Rabbi of Great Britain and the Commonwealth 1948–1965
 James Brodie (disambiguation), several people
 Jean P. Brodie, British astrophysicist
 Joe Brodie, drummer in Drowners
 John Brodie, American football quarterback
 John Brodie (footballer, born 1862), English footballer
 John Brodie (footballer, born 1947), English footballer
 John Alexander Brodie (1858–1934), British civil engineer
 John H. Brodie, American theoretical physicist, expert in string theory
 John Leopold Brodie, designer of the Brodie helmet in 1915
 John Brodie Innes, vicar of Downe and friend of Charles Darwin
 John William Brodie-Innes, leading member of the Hermetic Order of the Golden Dawn's Amen-Ra Temple
 Joshua Brodie, New Zealand cricketer
 Leanna Brodie, Canadian actor and playwright
 Leith Brodie, Australian sprint freestyle and medley swimmer
 Malcolm Brodie (journalist), Scottish-born journalist from Northern Ireland
 Malcolm Brodie (politician), the mayor of Richmond, British Columbia since 2001
 Michael Brodie, British boxer
 Michael Brodie (rugby league), Ireland international rugby league footballer
 Mike Brodie, American photographer
 Paul Brodie, Canadian saxophonist
 Paul Brodie, Canadian bicycle manufacturer (Brodie Bicycles), Mountain Bike Hall of Fame inductee
 Peter Bellinger Brodie (1815–1897), British geologist and churchman
 Philip Hope Brodie, Scottish law Lord
 Regis Brodie, American Professor of Art at Skidmore College in Saratoga Springs, NY
 Richard Brodie (cricketer), Scottish-born Australian cricketer
 Richard Brodie (footballer), English footballer
 Richard Brodie (programmer), American author of Microsoft Word and professional poker player
 Sam Brodie (born 1988), Indonesian-Scottish presenter and actor
 Sara Brodie, New Zealand theatre director and choreographer
 Starla Brodie, American World Series of Poker champion
Steve Brodie (disambiguation), several people
 T. J. Brodie, Canadian hockey player
 Thomas L. Brodie, Irish theologian
 Thomas Brodie-Sangster, English actor
 Walter Brodie, New Zealand politician
 Walter Lorrain Brodie, Scottish recipient of Victoria Cross
 William Brodie (1741–1788), known as Deacon Brodie, Scottish cabinet-maker and deacon of a trades guild
 William Brodie (sculptor) (1815–1881), Scottish sculptor

Fictional characters
 Axel Brodie, in the Yu-Gi-Oh! GX anime series
 Ewan Brodie, in the series Monarch of the Glen
 Jean Brodie, in the novel The Prime of Miss Jean Brodie and film adaptation
 J. H. Brodie, in the television series Homicide: Life on the Street
 Melanie Brodie, in the series Degrassi Junior High
 Brodie family, from the BBC One Scotland soap opera River City

Given name

 Brodie Atkinson, Australian rules footballer
 Brodie Croyle, American football quarterback for the Kansas City Chiefs
 Brodie Dupont, Canadian ice hockey forward
 Brodie Farber, American mixed martial arts fighter
 Brodie Greer, American actor
 Brodie Henderson (rugby union), Canadian international rugby union player
 Brodie Henderson (engineer), British railway engineer
 Brodie Holland, Australian rules footballer in the Australian Football League
 Brodie Lee, American professional wrestler
 Brodie MacDonald, Canadian lacrosse player
 Brodie McGhie Willcox, British co-founder of the Peninsular & Oriental Steam Navigation Company
 Brodie Moles, Australian rules football player
 Brodie Mooy, Australian football (soccer) player
 Brodie Neill, Australian industrial designer
 Brodie Retallick (born 1991), New Zealand rugby union player
 Brodie West, Canadian musician
 Brodie Westen (1932–2021), American coach for the Western Illinois University Leathernecks
 Brodie Young, Australian reality television star

Fictional characters
 Brodie Bruce, played by Jason Lee in the film Mallrats
 Brodie Hanson, in the Australian soap opera Home and Away

Coats of arms
Brodie coats of arms include:

See also
Brody (name), given name and surname

References

External links
 Brodie genealogical family trees
 www.brodiewiki.com – Brodie family genealogy, information, and wiki

Scottish family coats of arms
Gaelic-language surnames
Surnames
Scottish toponymic surnames
Scottish feminine given names
Scottish masculine given names
Scottish unisex given names